One Mile is a suburb of the Port Stephens local government area in the Hunter Region of New South Wales, Australia. The Worimi people are the traditional owners of the Port Stephens area. The suburb is semi-rural with a small urban settlement, several eco-resorts and back-packer accommodations to the west of Gan Gan Road. On the beach side there is a residential land-lease community (Middlerock Home Village) and three tourist parks. The parks, two of which have licensed restaurants, are positioned to provide quick access to the suburb's two beaches. Since late 2017 Port Stephens Koala Hospital has been operating in the grounds of Treescape resort .

One Mile Beach, after which the area was named, is a family-friendly surf beach that is popular with tourists while Samurai Beach is accessible only by off-road vehicles and is clothing optional. Both beaches, like a large percentage of the locality, lie within the Tomaree National Park. The beaches form most of the coastline of Anna Bay which gave the adjacent suburb of Anna Bay its name. The beach has a Surf Club, kiosk, barbecue and picnics area as well as public amenities.

Although the suburb is formally called One Mile residents often refer to it as One Mile Beach. Until 2016, even some road signs identified the area incorrectly as One Mile Beach.

Notes

References

External links
 
 One Mile Beach - Beachsafe Surf Life Saving Website
 Samurai Beach - Beachsafe Surf Life Saving Website
 Port Stephens Koala Hospital Port Stephens Koalas Website

Suburbs of Port Stephens Council
Bays of New South Wales
Beaches of New South Wales